The 2016 Montana State Bobcats football team represented Montana State University as a member of the Big Sky Conference during the 2016 NCAA Division I FCS football season. Led by first-year head coach Jeff Choate, Montana State compiled an overall record of 4–7 with a mark of 2–6 in conference play, placing in a four-way tie for ninth place in the Big Sky. The Bobcats played their home games at Bobcat Stadium in Bozeman, Montana.

Athletic director search
After 14 years as athletic director, Peter Fields's contract was not to be renewed for the 2016 season. On May 2, Montana State officially introduced Kyle Brennan as the new athletic director. However, on May 10, Brennan backed out of the job citing that the job "didn't feel right". Later that same day, MSU announced that they would hire Leon Costello as the new athletic director.

Recruits

Schedule

Game summaries

at Idaho

Bryant

Western Oregon

North Dakota

at Sacramento State

Northern Arizona

at Weber State

Eastern Washington

at Southern Utah

UC Davis

at Montana

References

Montana State
Montana State Bobcats football seasons
Montana State Bobcats football